Loonies is a 2002 Dutch family film, based on a Dutch TV series Loonies (Dutch Loenatik).

The film received a Golden Film (75,000 visitors) in 2002.

External links

2002 films
2002 comedy films
Dutch comedy films
2000s Dutch-language films
Films based on television series